Souli is a village and a community in the municipality of Megalopoli in southwestern Arcadia, Greece. The community consists of the mountain villages Souli and Derveni. Both villages are located in the mountains on the border with Messenia, at about 500 m elevation. Derveni is on the old road from Megalopoli to Kalamata, and Souli is 1 km southeast of it. Souli is 2 km west of Chirades, 4 km southwest of Paradeisia, 15 km southwest of Megalopoli and 30 km north of Kalamata. Souli suffered damage from the 2007 Greek forest fires.

Historical population

See also
List of settlements in Arcadia

References

External links
History and information about Derveni
History and information about Souli
Souli on GTP

Megalopolis, Greece
Populated places in Arcadia, Peloponnese